Adam C. Gray is an American politician who served in the California State Assembly. He is a Democrat who represented the 21st Assembly district, encompassing all of Merced County and portions of Stanislaus County. He was a candidate in the 2022 election for California's 13th congressional district, narrowly losing in the general election to Republican John Duarte.

Early life and education

Gray graduated from Golden Valley High School and then attended Merced College before earning his bachelor's degree in political science from the University of California at Santa Barbara.

Early career

Gray worked in the district office of Assemblymember Dennis Cardoza. He was also a staffer for lawmakers Herb Wesson, Fabian Nunez, and Jerome Horton.

Gray was also a member of the staff of state Senator Ron Calderon. In July 2013, Gray testified in the federal investigation involving corruption charges against Calderon.

Political career

State legislature

Gray was elected to the California State Assembly in November 2012, receiving 58.2% of the vote. In the 2014 primary election, Gray received 95.3% of the vote and was reelected in 2016 with 66.8% of the vote and again in 2018 with 71.3% of the vote. In 2020, he received 59.6% of the vote.

He was on the Committee for Accountability and Administrative Review, the Agriculture Committee, the Revenue and Taxation Committee and the Select Committee on Health Care Access in Rural Communities. Gray was also a member of the Joint Legislative Committee on Emergency Management. He was chairman of the Governmental Organization Committee, but was stripped of his chairmanship in December 2020 due to a dispute over water rights.

In July 2014, Gray supported Merced and Stanislaus counties as a potential site for Tesla Motors' multibillion-dollar "Giga-Factory".

U.S. House campaign

On January 18, 2022, Gray announced that he would be a candidate for California's 13th congressional district in the 2022 election for the United States House of Representatives. He advanced from June 2022 primary and faced Republican farmer John Duarte in the November 2022 general election. He conceded the race on December 3, 2022, shortly after the race was called by the Associated Press. It was one of the last U.S. House races in the country to be decided.

Electoral history

2014

2016

2018

2020

References

External links 

 Adam Gray for Congress campaign website

21st-century American politicians
Living people
Democratic Party members of the California State Assembly
People from Merced, California
University of California, Santa Barbara alumni
1977 births